This was the first edition of the tournament.

Brian Baker and Nikola Mektić won the title, defeating Juan Sebastián Cabal and Robert Farah in the final, 7–6(7–2), 6–4.

Seeds

Draw

Draw

References
 Main Draw

Hungarian Open (tennis)
Gazprom Hungarian Open – Doubles